The 1903 Invercargill mayoral election was held on 29 April 1903 as part of that year's local elections.

Former mayor George Froggatt defeated the incumbent Charles Stephen Longuet.

Results
The following table gives the election results:

References

1903 elections in New Zealand
Mayoral elections in Invercargill